The Fort Lee School District or Fort Lee Public Schools is a comprehensive community public school district that serves students in pre-Kindergarten through twelfth grade from Fort Lee, in Bergen County, New Jersey, United States.

As of the 2018–19 school year, the district, comprising six schools, had an enrollment of 4,103 students and 301.2 classroom teachers (on an FTE basis), for a student–teacher ratio of 15:1.

The district is classified by the New Jersey Department of Education as being in District Factor Group "FG", the fourth-highest of eight groupings. District Factor Groups organize districts statewide to allow comparison by common socioeconomic characteristics of the local districts. From lowest socioeconomic status to highest, the categories are A, B, CD, DE, FG, GH, I and J.

Awards and recognition
During the 2010-11 school year, School #3 was awarded the Blue Ribbon School Award of Excellence by the United States Department of Education, the highest award an American school can receive, one of only 10 schools statewide to be honored. The school was one of three in Bergen County honored that year.

Fort Lee High School has been ranked very highly both by U.S. News & World Report (92 of 451 in 2020) and the New Jersey Department of Education ranking (89% percentile in the state). The elementary and middle schools have consistently been ranked highly too.

Controversy
Fort Lee Elementary School 1 was in the news in 2018, receiving local and even out-of-state media coverage after a teacher's assistant pleaded guilty to selling drugs on school grounds.

Schools
Schools in the district (with 2018–19 enrollment data from the National Center for Education Statistics) are:
Elementary schools
School 1 (761 students in grades K-4)
Rosemary Giacomelli, Principal 
School 2 (493; PreK-4)
John Brennan, Principal
School 3 (596; K-4)
Jay Berman, Principal
School 4 (614; K-4)
Patrick Ambrosio, Principal
Intermediate / Middle school
Lewis F. Cole Intermediate School / Lewis F. Cole Middle School (585; 5-8)
Dr. Robert Daniello, Principal
High school
Fort Lee High School (1,012; 9-12)
Lauren Glynn, Principal

Administrators
Core members of the district's administration are:
Robert Kravitz, Superintendent of Schools
Haqquisha Q. Taylor, Business Administrator / Board Secretary

Former District Superintendent Dr. Raymond Bandlow announced in August 2011 that although he had over two years left on his contract, he would be retiring in New Jersey effective October 31 to accept a position as superintendent of the Beacon City Schools in Beacon, New York. In addition to collecting a New Jersey pension, Bandlow will receive an annual salary below the $210,000 he had been receiving in Fort Lee, but more than the nearly $165,000 he would have received in a new contract in Fort Lee following restrictions on salaries imposed by Governor of New Jersey Chris Christie.

Board of education
The district's board of education, comprised of nine members, sets policy and oversees the fiscal and educational operation of the district through its administration. As a Type II school district, the board's trustees are elected directly by voters to serve three-year terms of office on a staggered basis, with three seats up for election each year held (since 2012) as part of the November general election. The board appoints a superintendent to oversee the day-to-day operation of the district.

References

External links
Fort Lee School District
 
School Data for the Fort Lee School District, National Center for Education Statistics

Fort Lee, New Jersey
New Jersey District Factor Group FG
School districts in Bergen County, New Jersey